Hoàng Long is a commune (xã) in Phú Xuyên District, Hanoi, Vietnam.

References

Populated places in Hanoi
Communes of Hanoi